Rita Edochie (born 16 April 1964) is a Nigerian film actress.

Early life and education
Edochie is Igbo. In 2016 she revealed that she was sexually assaulted in primary school and gave birth to a child.

Career
In 2016, she received the Ambassador For Peace Award of the Universal Peace Federation.

Personal life
In December 1990, she married Tony Edochie, the younger brother of Pete Edochie; they have four children. She is the aunt of both Yul Edochie and Muna Obiekwe.

References

External links
  

Igbo actresses
Living people
Actresses from Anambra State
Nigerian film actresses
1964 births
Nigerian film producers
Nigerian models
Nigerian television personalities
Nigerian television actresses